Lucie Pader (born 21 December 1992) is a French professional racing cyclist. She rides for team Poitou–Charentes.Futuroscope.86.

See also
 List of 2015 UCI Women's Teams and riders

References

External links
 

1992 births
Living people
French female cyclists
Sportspeople from Clermont-Ferrand
Cyclists from Auvergne-Rhône-Alpes